Khelsai Singh  (1 January 1947 Shivpur, Surguja district (Madhya Pradesh)) is a leader from Chhattisgarh. He was a member of the Lok Sabha representing Surguja (Lok Sabha constituency). He was elected to 10th, 11th and 13th Lok Sabha.

See also
Chhattisgarh Legislative Assembly

References

External links

Indian National Congress politicians from Chhattisgarh
India MPs 1991–1996
People from Surguja district
1947 births
Living people
India MPs 1996–1997
India MPs 1999–2004
Lok Sabha members from Chhattisgarh